Midu County is a county in the Dali Bai Autonomous Prefecture located in west-central Yunnan province, China.

Administrative divisions
Midu County has 6 towns, 1 township and 1 ethnic township. 
6 towns

1 township
 Deju
1 ethnic township
 Niujie Yi

Ethnic groups
The Midu County Gazetteer (1993:721) lists the following ethnic groups.
Yi people
Mocha 墨叉
Luowu 罗婺
Tuzu 土族
Hui people
Bai people
Lisu people
Han people

Transportation 
China National Highway 214

Climate

References

County-level divisions of Dali Bai Autonomous Prefecture